Leonard Victor Worle (26 May 1889 – 10 October 1948) was an Australian rules footballer who played with Essendon in the Victorian Football League (VFL).

Family
One of five children, the son of Thomas Worle (1845-1915), and Eliza Worle (1857-1912), née Dennis, Leonard Victor Worle was born at Collingwood on 26 May 1889. His brother, Thomas Henry Worle (1885-1917), played for Collingwood.

He married Henrietta Bromley (1890-1982) in 1912.

Military service
He enlisted in the First AIF, and served overseas with the 2nd Australian Field Artillery Brigade.

Death
He died at North Fitzroy on 10 October 1948.

Notes

References
 
 Maplestone, M., Flying Higher: History of the Essendon Football Club 1872–1996, Essendon Football Club, (Melbourne), 1996. 
 First World War Nominal Roll: Bombardier Leonard Victor Worle (1129), collection of the Australian War Memorial.
 First World War Nominal Roll: Sergeant Leonard Victor Worle (1129), collection of the Australian War Memorial.
 First World War Service Record: Sergeant Leonard Victor Worle (1129), National Archives of Australia.
 Repatriation Department File: Sergeant Leonard Victor Worle (1129), National Archives of Australia.

External links 
 
 
 Leon Worle, at The VFA Project.

1889 births
1948 deaths
Australian rules footballers from Melbourne
Essendon Football Club players
Australian military personnel of World War I
People from Collingwood, Victoria
Military personnel from Melbourne